Charles Henry Larkin Sr., (May 12, 1810August 16, 1894) was an American merchant, real estate developer, and Wisconsin pioneer.  He was a member of the Wisconsin State Senate (1866–1870) and State Assembly (1872, 1874, 1875), representing southern Milwaukee County, and was sheriff of Milwaukee County in 1861 and 1862.

Background 
Larkin was born in Stonington, Connecticut, on May 2, 1810. He attended private schools (no public schools being available) until the age of sixteen, at which time he took a job as a retail clerk in the town of Alden, New York (to which his family had moved in 1825), and worked there for three years, before moving on to similar positions in Buffalo and elsewhere. In 1836 he arrived in the Milwaukee area, after having visited Michigan and other western territories, and settled there. He laid claim to a quarter-section of land in Greenfield township, and lived there for two years to perfect his title to the land. While doing so, he bought and sold horses and engaged in various businesses. In 1848 he opened a store at the foot of East Water Street in the City of Milwaukee and dealt extensively in produce, livestock, and so forth. He also invested in real estate, and after a few years retired from other business and gave his attention chiefly to his real-estate interests.

Politics 
He started his political life as an ardent admirer of Henry Clay and a Whig. During his residence in Greenfield he served as a member of the Milwaukee County board of supervisors. He served as a Sergeant-at-Arms for the Wisconsin Territorial Council's 1845 session; he was a delegate from Milwaukee County to the second Wisconsin constitutional convention. He was appointed Milwaukee County treasurer; was appointed a pension agent by President James Buchanan, and served four years; served on the Milwaukee Board of School Directors (school board) for four years, and was elected sheriff of Milwaukee County in 1860 and served two years.

In 1862, Larkin was commissioned a colonel by the governor to raise a regiment of troops. Feeling too old to engage in warfare, instead he assisted his son, Courtland P. Larkin, to enlist a company of the 38th Wisconsin Volunteer Infantry Regiment.

Beginning in 1866, he was a Democratic member of the Wisconsin State Senate from the Sixth District (the 3rd, 4th, 5th and 8th Wards of the City of Milwaukee, and the Towns of Milwaukee, Greenfield, Lake, and Oak Creek), succeeding fellow Democrat Hugh Reynolds; he was assigned to the standing committee on banks and banking, but switched to that on railroads for the 1868 and 1869 sessions. In the 1870 election he ran as an Independent and was defeated by Democratic candidate Peter V. Deuster, by 2178 to 1704.

In 1871, identified as a War Democrat, he was elected as a member of the Wisconsin State Assembly from the Fifth Milwaukee County Assembly district (the 5th and 12th Wards of Milwaukee), with 508 votes to 325 for Republican John Lund. He lost his seat in the 1872 election to Republican John A. Becher by 703 votes to Becher's 773, but reclaimed it from him the next year, by 822 to 714, and defeated Republican David Vance in 1874. He was not a candidate in 1875, and Vance won the election to succeed him.

Personal life and later years 
He built a block of stores on Reed Street, and as late as 1893 was engaged in the construction of a block of buildings downtown. His religious affiliation was with the Episcopal church. He was deeply interested in the Milwaukee County Pioneer Society. He died at his home in Milwaukee on August 16, 1894.

Electoral history

Wisconsin Senate (1865, 1867, 1869)

| colspan="6" style="text-align:center;background-color: #e9e9e9;"| General Election, November 2, 1869

Wisconsin Assembly (1871, 1872, 1873, 1874)

References 

1810 births
1894 deaths
19th-century American Episcopalians
Businesspeople from Wisconsin
County supervisors in Wisconsin
Members of the Wisconsin State Assembly
People of Wisconsin in the American Civil War
People from Stonington, Connecticut
Politicians from Milwaukee
School board members in Wisconsin
Wisconsin Democrats
Wisconsin Independents
Wisconsin sheriffs
Wisconsin state senators
Wisconsin Territory officials
Wisconsin Whigs
19th-century American businesspeople